Talacre railway station served the village of Talacre, near Prestatyn on the North Wales Coast Line.

History
The station was opened in 1903 by the London and North Western Railway. Platforms were provided on the slow lines only. The station closed in February 1966, as part of the cost-saving reforms introduced by Dr Beeching.

Following closure parts of the platforms (in 2020) were still in situ. The signalbox remained in use until closure in March 2018 – for many years this controlled access to the busy exchange sidings for the nearby Point of Ayr Colliery. The mine closed in 1996 and the site has since been cleared, but the disused sidings are still visible from passing trains.

References

Further reading

Former London and North Western Railway stations
Railway stations in Great Britain opened in 1903
Railway stations in Great Britain closed in 1966
Disused railway stations in Flintshire
Beeching closures in Wales